Richard B. Fisher (October 27, 1948 – December 20, 2019) was an American professional basketball power forward who spent one season in the American Basketball Association (ABA) as a member of the Utah Stars and The Floridians (1971–72). He attended Trinidad State Junior College where he played quarterback for the school's football team. Fisher transferred to Colorado State University where he became a standout on the basketball team. He was drafted by the Portland Trail Blazers during the second round of the 1971 NBA draft, but he never signed.

Fisher died on December 20, 2019.

References

External links

1948 births
2019 deaths
American men's basketball players
Basketball players from Denver
Colorado State Rams men's basketball players
Junior college men's basketball players in the United States
Portland Trail Blazers draft picks
Miami Floridians players
Power forwards (basketball)
Utah Stars players